Maksim Anatolyevich Zyuzin (born 9 August 1986) is a Russian former professional football player.

Club career
He made his Russian Premier League debut for FC Volga Nizhny Novgorod on 14 March 2011 in a game against FC Tom Tomsk.

External links
 

1986 births
Sportspeople from Irkutsk
Living people
Russian footballers
Association football defenders
FC Asmaral Moscow players
FC Volga Nizhny Novgorod players
Russian Premier League players
FC Sibir Novosibirsk players
FC Nizhny Novgorod (2007) players
FC SKA-Khabarovsk players
FC Khimki players
FC Zvezda Irkutsk players
FC Luch Vladivostok players
FC Mordovia Saransk players
FC Dynamo Stavropol players
FC Neftekhimik Nizhnekamsk players
FC Spartak-MZhK Ryazan players